Trichodesmium erythraeum is a species of cyanobacteria that are unique in being visible to the naked eye. This species is also known as "sea sawdust". It was originally discovered in 1770 by Captain Cook off the coast of Australia.

Anatomy
This is a prolific nitrogen-fixing and phosphorus reducing species of bacteria that fixes approximately half of the nitrogen in the food chain of the ocean and contributes to the turn over of phosphorus. Unlike other bacteria, it can also photosynthesize. This is a colonial species that forms long filaments and tends to accumulate with other Trichodesmium. It is gram-negative and motile. Some of the bacteria in the colony fix the nitrogen, and others are specialized for photosynthesis. However, the two processes must be done with two of them, because the oxygen byproduct that results from photosynthesis would interfere with the nitrogen-fixing process. This is done either by, having two separate cells share resources with each other or by separating the processes by time in the same cell. If the cells are physically separated, then one cell specializes as a diazotroph and undergoes nitrogen fixation while other cells undergo photosynthesis. Alternatively, T. erythraeum also has been shown to separate the processes of photosynthesis and nitrogen fixation in the same cell by separating the time at which these processes occur. When this is done T. erythraeum will stop photosynthesizing at midday or night and begin oxygen scavenging as it begins nitrogen fixation. Additionally, T. erythraeum have gas vesicles that account for 60–70% of the cell's volume. These vesicles allow T. erythraeum to move in the water coulomb up to 200 m using its buoyancy based on the concentrations of carbohydrates in order to search out nutrients such as nitrogen, phosphorus and iron.

Genetics 
T. erythraeum has one of the largest bacterial genomes sequenced so far at 7.75 mbp. It has a GC content of 34% and contains approximately 40% non-coding DNA. There is evidence to suggest that the genome is in an expanding dynamic state due to the expansion of the genome through horizontal gene transfer. T. erythraeum shows a 98% homology with T. thiebautii but only a 75% homology with other cyanobacteria such as Oscillatoria.

Environment 
T. erythraeum was isolated off the coast of North Carolina. It resides in tropical and subtropical areas of the ocean typically from the surface to 40m however they can travel as deep as 200 m in search of nutrients. They have a pH optima of 7.8–8.4 and an optimal temperature of 24–30 degrees Celsius in aerobic conditions. T. erythraeum can, however, survive in lower temperatures and through periods of darkness.

Discoloration of the Red Sea
This species can also literally turn the Red Sea a red color that can be seen from outer space. The cause of this is unknown, but most scientists believe that a species of bacteria of the Trichodesmium genus, most likely this species, is the cause.

References

Oscillatoriales